Abdeslam Al Mesbahi ( born 1954, in Taza) is a Moroccan politician of the Istiqlal Party. Between 2007 and 2012, he held the position of Secretary of State for Territorial Development in the cabinet of Abbas El Fassi.

See also
Cabinet of Morocco

References

Government ministers of Morocco
1954 births
Living people
People from Taza
Istiqlal Party politicians